Xiangyang is a town of Guanghan, Sichuan, China. , it has two residential communities and 15 villages under its administration.

References

Township-level divisions of Sichuan
Guanghan